Bonium Thokchom is an Indian actor and singer who predominantly appears in Manipuri films. He has also acted in many Shumang Kumhei plays and music videos.

Early life and education

Thokchom lives in Kongba Nandeibam Leikai, Imphal, Manipur. He was born as a second child to Thokchom Loken and Thokchom Ongbi Bedamani. He has eight siblings including three sisters.

He completed his graduation from D.M. College under the Manipur University.

Career

He started his career as an anchor in ISTV Network's Hello Hello Programme and as an interviewer in the local cable television network.

His first appearance in movies was a supporting role in Romi Meitei's Ekhenglaktagi Red Rose. His first film in which he portrays the main antagonist is Ajit Ningthouja's Meerang Mahum, and he appears as a lead male protagonist in Nangna Nokpa Yengningi.

His home production Bonium Thokchom Films (BTF) was launched in 2016, under which a film titled Soinairaba Thamoi was produced. The film was released on 14 July 2018.

As of 2018, he started working on the movie Eephuut as a producer and an actor. It is written and directed by Herojit Naoroibam.

Accolades

Thokchom won the Best Actor Award for the music video Engao Ngaojabi at the 2nd Manipur State Level Music Video Album Festival hosted by Manipur Film Development Corporation (MFDC). He won the Best Male Playback Singer for a song in the film Nangna Nokpa Yengningi in the 5th SSS MANIFA 2016.

Filmography

References 

Living people
21st-century Indian male actors
Indian male film actors
Male actors from Manipur
Meitei people
People from Imphal
1988 births
Shumang Kumhei artists